Joël Bacanamwo (born 23 May 1998) is a Burundian footballer, who plays as a defender. Born in Belgium, Bacanamwo represents the Burundi national football team internationally.

Career
Bacanamwo started playing football at the age of 7. At the age of 10, he joined K.V.K. Tienen-Hageland. He later joined Sint-Truidense at the age of 15. In November 2018, he signed his first professional contract with A.F.C. Tubize.

International career
Bacanamwo was born in Brussels, Belgium, on 23 May 1998 to Burundian parents who had fled from the outbreak of civil war in Burundi in 1993. He grew up in Brussels until he was 6 years old before his family moved to Landen.

Bacanamwo represented the Burundi national football team in a 1-1 2022 FIFA World Cup qualification tie with Tanzania on 4 September 2019.

References

External links

1998 births
Living people
Footballers from Brussels
Belgian people of Burundian descent
Burundian footballers
Burundi international footballers
Association football midfielders
Challenger Pro League players
A.F.C. Tubize players
Liga III players
CS Știința Miroslava players
Burundian expatriate footballers
Burundian expatriate sportspeople in Romania
Expatriate footballers in Romania
Belgian footballers